Öland Roots is an annual reggae music festival on Öland, Sweden. It has been held since 2004 in June or July with about 2 000 visitors. 
The festival is known to be comparatively calm with little violence and few arrests.

See also
List of reggae festivals
Reggae

References

External links
Öland Roots official website (English)
Öland Roots official website (Swedish)

Reggae festivals
Music festivals in Sweden
Öland
Summer events in Sweden